The VTV Awards is an awards ceremony presented by Vietnam Television (VTV) to honour the most notable television productions aired on its network. It was launched in 2014 and is usually held in early September each year until 2021, when the date was moved to January 1 the following year.

Rules
The VTV Awards comprises two rounds:

Round 1
 Nominees are selected by crews from departments/centers under VTV.
 Voting by a jury or/and audiences will pick out Top 5 of each category. Before 2019, the result only based on audience's vote. Later, the votes are collected from both jury and audience except 2021 when the nominees for Top 10 & Top 5 are completely jury's picks.
 Round 1 ends a week before the ceremony, it changed into a month since 2021. After this round, the score and votes will be refreshed in order to continue voting in Round 2.

Round 2
 Top 5 nominees continues to get votes by jury and audience in this round (with a ratio of 50:50).
From 2014 to 2021:
 Round 2 ends at 07:09 on the day of ceremony (the numbers 7 and 9 represent 7 September, the date of VTV's launch)
 The organizers will pick out the person/group/product(s) voted the most in each category. The winners will be honoured in the live broadcast on the evening of the same day on VTV1.
 Audience can vote via SMS, or on the official site of the awards, or VTVGo mobile app in 2021.
Since 2022:
 Round 2 ends at 23:59 on December 30.
 The votes are collected from both jury and audience with a ratio of 50:50 picking out the Top 3, and the winner will be honoured in the award ceremony on January 1.
 Audiences can only vote via VTVGo mobile app.

Categories

Current categories
Currently, the awards has given prizes in 10 categories:

Discontinued categories

Awards for individuals

Presenter

Artist/singer

Comedian

Actor/actress

Guest/figure

Awards for productions

Drama

Precursor prize 
Starting in 2003, 'The Most Beloved Vietnam Television Dramas' Voting Contest (Vietnamese: Cuộc thi bình chọn phim truyền hình Việt Nam được yêu thích nhất) is held annually or biennially by VTV Television Magazine to honor Vietnamese television dramas broadcast during the year(s) on two channels VTV1-VTV3. The awards ceremony takes place early next year.

Documentary

News reports

Image

Humanistic image

Topical image

Viral image

Stage

Program

References

External links
List of television programmes broadcast by Vietnam Television (VTV)
Official website 

 
Television awards
Vietnamese awards
Awards established in 2014
Annual events in Vietnam